NPC may stand for:

Science and medicine

Computing
Network Parameter Control in computer networks
Non-deterministic polynomial-time complete
Non-printing character
Non-player character

Electronics
Neutral Point Clamped, an inverter topology

Medicine
Nasopharyngeal carcinoma
"Near point of convergence" or "no previous correction", optometric abbreviations
Neural progenitor cell; see Notch signaling pathway
Niemann–Pick disease, type C
NPC1, a protein involved in the disease
NPC2, a protein involved in the disease
Nuclear pore complex, in molecular biology

Organisations

Corporations
 National Petrochemical Company of Iran
 National Power Corporation, the Philippines
 Nauru Phosphate Corporation, Republic of Nauru
 Nevada Power Company, United States

Political organisations
National Peace Council, UK
Nationalist People's Coalition, a political party in the Philippines
National People's Congress, China
National Petroleum Council (US)
Northern People's Congress, a political party in Nigeria

Student organisations
National Panhellenic Conference, of North American sororities
National Postgraduate Committee, UK

Other organisations
see also under Sport, below
 National Press Club, several press clubs
Niagara Parks Commission, Ontario, Canada
Northern Provincial Council, Sri Lanka

Sport and games

Sport
National Paralympic Committee
National Physique Committee, a US bodybuilding organization
National Provincial Championship (1976–2005), New Zealand rugby competition
National Provincial Championship (2006–present), New Zealand rugby competition
Non-playing captain of a team in contract bridge

Computer and video games
Non-player character
NPC (meme), an Internet meme

Research and educational facilities
National Paralegal College, Phoenix, Arizona, US
National Park College, Hot Springs, Arkansas, US
Netherlands Proteomics Centre, Netherlands

Other
 National Ploughing Championships, Ireland, an agricultural show
 NATO Programming Centre, for air system support
 Neighbourhood police centre, a type of police station in Singapore
 NPC (cable system), linking Japan and the US
 Fujicolor NPC 160, later Fujicolor Pro 160C, photographic film